Acalyptris insolentis is a moth of the Nepticulidae family. It is found in premontane and lowland Amazon rainforest in Ecuador.

The wingspan is 3.8-4.5 mm for males.

External links
New Neotropical Nepticulidae (Lepidoptera) from the western Amazonian rainforest and the Andes of Ecuador

Nepticulidae
Endemic fauna of Ecuador
Moths of South America
Moths described in 2002